Ebenezar Olaoluwa Fagbemi (born 20 October 1984) is a Nigerian male badminton player. He competed at the 2002 and 2010 Commonwealth Games. At the All-Africa Games, he has collected three golds, two silvers and three bronzes from 2003-2015.

Achievements

All African  Games 
Men's singles

Men's doubles

African Championships 
Men's singles

Men's doubles

Mixed doubles

BWF International Challenge/Series
Men's singles

Men's doubles

Mixed doubles

 BWF International Challenge tournament
 BWF International Series tournament
 BWF Future Series tournament

References

External links 
 

Living people
1984 births
Nigerian male badminton players
Badminton players at the 2002 Commonwealth Games
Badminton players at the 2010 Commonwealth Games
Commonwealth Games competitors for Nigeria
Competitors at the 2003 All-Africa Games
Competitors at the 2007 All-Africa Games
Competitors at the 2011 All-Africa Games
Competitors at the 2015 African Games
African Games gold medalists for Nigeria
African Games silver medalists for Nigeria
African Games bronze medalists for Nigeria
African Games medalists in badminton
21st-century Nigerian people